Herat is one of the thirty-four provinces of Afghanistan, located in the north-western part of the country. Together with Badghis, Farah, and Ghor provinces, it makes up the north-western region of Afghanistan. Its primary city and administrative capital is Herat City. The province of Herat is divided into about 17 districts and contains over 2,000 villages. It has a population of about 3,780,000, making it the second most populated province in Afghanistan behind Kabul Province. The population is multi-ethnic but largely Persian-speaking. Herat dates back to the Avestan times and was traditionally known for its wine. The city has a number of historic sites, including the Herat Citadel and the Musalla Complex. During the Middle Ages Herat became one of the important cities of Khorasan, as it was known as the Pearl of Khorasan.

The province of Herat shares a border with Iran in the west and Turkmenistan in the north, making it an important trading region. The Trans-Afghanistan Pipeline (TAPI) is expected to pass through Herat from Turkmenistan to Pakistan and India in the south. The province has two airports, one is the Herat International Airport in the capital of Herat and the other is at the Shindand Air Base, which is one of the largest military bases in Afghanistan. The Salma Dam which is fed by the Hari River is also located in this province.

History

The region of Herat was historically part of Greater Khorasan, which was successively controlled by the Tahirids followed by the Saffarids, Samanids, Ghaznavids, Ghurids, Ilkhanates, Timurids, Safavids, Hotakis, Afsharids, Durranis, Qajarids until it became part of the modern state of Afghanistan.

During the 19th century, the British arrived from southern Afghanistan as part of the "Great Game" and backed up the Afghans during one Persian siege and one capture of the city, the former in 1838, and the latter in 1856 in order to prevent Persian or Russian influence reaching deeper in South Asia, and also, more importantly, Britain's colony in India as part of the Great Game. The situation in province then remained quiet and uneventful until the 1979 Soviet invasion of Afghanistan.

The province saw a number of battles during the 1980s Soviet war, and remained an active area of guerrilla warfare throughout, with local mujahideen commander Ismail Khan leading resistance against the Soviet-backed Afghan government. This continued until the Soviet Union withdrew all its forces in 1989.

When the Soviets withdrew from Afghanistan, Ismail Khan became the governor of the province, a position he retained until the Taliban forces from the south took control of the province in 1995. Following the ousting of the Taliban and establishment of the Karzai administration, led by Hamid Karzai, Ismail Khan once again became governor of Herat.

Ismail Khan become a figure of controversy when the media began reporting that he was attempting to restrict freedom of the people, and that he was becoming more of an independent ruler as a warlord. He lost a son Mirwais Sadiq in 2004 during a fight with forces of other warlords. In response to this, the central government began expanding into the province with the newly trained Afghan National Security Forces (ANFS). Ismail Khan was ordered to leave his post to become a minister and live in Kabul.

After 2005, the International Security Assistance Force (ISAF) established presence in the area to help assist the Afghan government. It is led by Italy. A multi-national Provincial Reconstruction Team (PRT) was also established to help the local population of the province. The United States established a consulate in Herat, trained Afghan security forces, built schools, and clinics.

Herat was one of the first seven areas that transitioned security responsibility from NATO to Afghanistan. On 21 July 2011, Afghan security forces assumed lead security responsibility from NATO. On the occasion, Minister of Defence Wardak told the audience, "this is our national responsibility to take over our security and defend our country."

Economy

The province is home to 90% of Afghanistan's Saffron production (a $12 million industry in 2014). In 2015 the World Bank noted that saffron cultivation had provided Herat Province's farmers a steady source of income, jobs for both men and women, and a decreased dependency on poppy cultivation.

With international borders to Iran and Turkmenistan and an international airport, trade could potentially play an important part in the economy of Herat Province. Due to the lack of urbanization in Herat Province, around 75% of the population lives in rural areas and economic activity is correspondingly heavily reliant on agriculture and horticulture production (saffron, rugs, cumin, marble, animal skins and wool) with around 82% of economic activity coming from these fields in 2011. Marble manufacturing and light industry comprised the remaining areas of economic activity.

Healthcare

The percentage of households with clean drinking water fell from 31% in 2005 to 28% in 2011. 
The percentage of births attended to by a skilled birth attendant increased from 24% in 2005 to 25% in 2011.

Education

The overall literacy rate (6+ years of age) fell from 36% in 2005 to 25% in 2011.
The overall net enrolment rate (6–13 years of age) fell from 55% in 2005 to 52% in 2011. Herat University is Afghanistan's second largest university with over 10,000 students, 14 faculties and 45 departments in 2014.

Demographics

As of 2020, the total population of the province is about 2,187,169, the majority of which live in rural parts. According to Afghanistan's Ministry of Rural Rehabilitation and Development:

Population by districts
The province is divided into 16 districts and contains over 1,000 villages.

Sport

Football is the popular sport in Herat Province, and in recent years cricket is also growing in popularity. The Province is represented in domestic competitions by the Herat Province cricket team. Afghanistan's national sport Buzkashi and a number of other sports are also played in the region.

Notable people
Abbas the Great – Safavid ruler
Sultan Husayn Mirza Bayqara –  Timurid ruler of Herat
Mirwais Hotak – founder of the Hotak dynasty
Ahmad Shah Durrani – founder of the Durrani dynasty
Ali-Shir Nava'i – poet, writer, politician, linguist, mystic, and painter
Faramarz Tamanna
Zablon Simintov
Ismail Khan – Tajik Commander of Jamiat Islami

Future

In December 2012, Afghanistan and Italy signed a "long term agreement" including a Euro 150 million soft loan facility for infrastructure projects in Herat Province. In 2014 the agreement for a first soft loan worth about US$32 million was agreed for the upgrade of the Herat airport. In 2016 a second soft loan agreement worth about US$100 million was signed between Afghanistan and Italy for the construction a 155 km road between Herat and Chist-e Sharif. Italy also agreed to assess the possibility of a third soft loan worth about US$70 million for completing the railroad connection between Herat and Mashad in Iran.
The Asian Development Bank is also implementing a feasibility study for the construction of a railway connection between Herat and Turkmenistan.

See also 
Provinces of Afghanistan
Train Advise Assist Command - West
Provincial Reconstruction Team (PRT) 
Azizabad airstrike

References

External links

 
Provinces of Afghanistan
Provinces of the Islamic Republic of Afghanistan